Paula-Mae Weekes  (born 23 December 1958) is a Trinidadian politician and jurist who was the sixth president of Trinidad and Tobago. She is the first female President of Trinidad and Tobago, as well as the second female head of state in Trinidad and Tobago after Elizabeth II and the second female president of African descent in the Americas following Ertha Pascal-Trouillot. She took office on 19 March 2018.

Career
Weekes attended Bishop Anstey High School, the University of the West Indies, Cave Hill, from which she graduated with a Bachelor of Laws degree, and the Hugh Wooding Law School; she was called to the Bar in 1982. After graduation she worked in the office of the Director of Public Prosecutions for 11 years, before going into private practice in 1993. She was appointed to the judiciary in 1996 and to the Court of Appeals in 2005, where she served until her retirement in 2016. She served briefly as acting Chief Justice in 2012 after acting Chief Justice Wendell Kangaloo was injured in a car accident. In September 2016 Weekes was appointed to the appeals court in the Turks and Caicos.

Presidency
On 5 January 2018, Weekes, then a judge of the Turks and Caicos Islands Court of Appeal, was put forward as a presidential candidate by the People's National Movement government of Prime Minister Keith Rowley in hopes of reaching a consensus with the United National Congress-led parliamentary opposition of Kamla Persad-Bissessar, which later endorsed her nomination. Her proposal for the post of president was also lauded by political analysts. As Weekes was the only nominated candidate on election day, she was deemed elected without the need for a vote.

References

1958 births
Living people
20th-century Trinidad and Tobago judges
21st-century Trinidad and Tobago women politicians
21st-century Trinidad and Tobago politicians
Female heads of state
Presidents of Trinidad and Tobago
21st-century Trinidad and Tobago judges
University of the West Indies alumni
Women presidents